is the capital city of Ōita Prefecture, located on the island of Kyushu, Japan.

On January 1, 2005, the town of Notsuharu (from Ōita District) and the town of Saganoseki (from Kitaamabe District) were merged into Ōita.

Demographics and geography 

Ōita is the most populous city in Ōita Prefecture. , the city has an estimated population of 478,491, with 216,853 households and a population density of 950 persons per km2. The total area of the city is 502.39 km2.

The city is bordered by the City of Beppu to the northwest, the City of Yufu to the west, the City of Taketa to the southwest, the City of Bungo-ōno to the south, and the City of Usuki to the southeast. The north of the city faces Beppu Bay and the Seto Inland Sea.

Economy 
During the 1960s and 1970s, an industrial region was formed along the Beppu Gulf coast. Among the plants in the region were flagship plants of Nippon Steel and Showa Denko.

In the 1970s, Toshiba and Canon built and expanded their plants in inland area. By then, the city emerged as a major production center of electronics products such as LSIs and digital cameras.

The downtown and shopping districts are located to the north of Oita Station. However, the area has been gradually declining because the main commercial areas have been dispersed due to the construction of big shopping malls in the suburbs.

History 

During the Sengoku period (15th–16th centuries), the powerful Ōtomo clan based in Funai and the area prospered as a key port of trade with Portugal and Ming-dynasty China. Ōtomo Sōrin, a famous Christian daimyō, first introduced western culture. It was in Funai that the first western style hospital was built and the first Japanese choir was formed.

Climate
Ōita has a humid subtropical climate (Köppen climate classification Cfa) with hot summers and cool winters. Precipitation is significant throughout the year, but is somewhat lower in winter.

Landmarks and points of interest 

 that borders Beppu is famous for wild monkeys, specifically the Japanese macaque.

Facing the entrance to the Takasaki-yama park is the "Ōita Marine Palace" aquarium, also known as "Umi-Tamago", or "Sea Egg".

The Ōita Stadium, also known as Big Eye or Kyushu Oil Dome, is situated along the city expressway. It is the home field of the J. League football club Oita Trinita and is used for large local events.

In the middle of the city, there are many shops and department stores. Some major departmental stores include Tokiwa, Parco, Frespo Kasugaura, and D Plaza. There are also shopping malls in the suburbs, such as Tokiwa Wasada Town and Park Place Oita.

Outside the city, scenic spots include mountain plateaus, seaside villages and towns renowned for onsen (geothermal hot springs).

Ōita is also famous for the intestines of puffer fish.

Toriten is another famous food in this city.

JNR C55 53 is a locomotive on display at Wakakusa Park. (See JNR C55)

Transportation 

The principal railway station of the city is Ōita Station where Nippō Main Line, Kyūdai Main Line, and Hōhi Main Line of JR Kyushu gathers. The luxury Aru Ressha train was designed by Eiji Mitooka. It runs between Ōita and Hita and is in service to also revive tourism and the local economy.

Buses are the primary mode of transportation in Oita, run by two main bus service companies. The Oita Bus Company operates bus routes in the city. The Oita Kotsu Company runs north of the city. For long-distance bus services, these two companies, as well as Kamenoi Bus Company operate bus routes from Oita to main place of Kyushu, such as Fukuoka and Kumamoto, and Osaka, Nagoya and more.

Oita Airport is located nearby, at Kunisaki, and used to be accessible via hovercraft, which takes about 30 minutes. However, this service has been suspended since late 2009. Other ways of accessing the airport is by bus, taxi or a private vehicle.

The Ōita Expressway, Higashikyushu Expressway, National Route 10 and National Route 210 all run through the city.

Many ships depart from the Port of Oita, to places such as Kansai, and Shikoku.

Sports 
Annual sporting events include:
 Beppu-Oita Mainichi Marathon, which traces a path between Ōita and its neighbouring city of Beppu. The competition has been held every year since 1952 and is classed as an IAAF Silver Label road race.
 The Kyūshū Ekiden, beginning in Nagasaki and ending in Fukuoka, the world's longest relay race

Sporting events held in Oita include:
1966 National Sports Festival of Japan
2001 Kirin Cup
2002 FIFA World Cup
2003, 2006, 2007 Kirin Challenge Cup
2005 J. League All-Star Soccer
2019 Rugby World Cup

Sports teams and facilities

Education 
Oita City operates all public elementary and junior high schools, while the prefecture operates the high schools.

National universities
Oita University

Prefectural universities
Oita University of Nursing and Health Sciences

Private universities
Nippon Bunri University
Beppu University – Oita Campus
Ritsumeikan Asia Pacific University

High schools
 Ōita Uenogaoka High School
 Ōita Oginodai High School
 Ōita Kōgyō High School
 Ōita Shōgyō High School
 Ōita Tsurusaki High School
 Ōita Nishi High School
 Ōita Higashi High School
 Ōita Hofu High School (middle and high school)
 Ōita Maizuru High School
 Ōita Minami High School
 Geijutsu Midorigaoka High School
 Jōhō Kagaku High School
 Tsurusaki Kōgyō High School

Notable people from Ōita
Mao Abe, singer-songwriter
Takamasa Anai, judo wrestler
Yuya Ando, baseball player
Chiyotaikai Ryūji, sumo wrestler
Eri Fukatsu, actress
Arata Isozaki, architect
Yūko Kotegawa, actress
Atsuhiro Miura, football player
Daisuke Miyazaki, handball player
Tomiichi Murayama, 81st Prime Minister of Japan
Shigeichi Nagano, photographer
Yūsuke Santamaria, tarento
Rino Sashihara, HKT48, former AKB48
Seiichi Uchikawa, baseball player
Naomi Zaizen, actress
Misa Eto, former Nogizaka46
Sosuke Genda, baseball player
Kenichi Shinoda (also known as Shinobu Tsukasa), Yakuza godfather, current kumicho of Yamaguchi-gumi, Japan's largest Yakuza organization

Sister cities 
  Aveiro, Portugal (1978)
  Wuhan, Hubei, China (1979)
  Austin, Texas, United States (1990)
  Guangzhou, Guangdong, China (1997)
  San Cristóbal, Táchira, Venezuela
  Vitória, Espírito Santo, Brazil
  Lausanne, Switzerland

References

External links

Ōita City official website 
Ōita City official website 

 
Cities in Ōita Prefecture
Port settlements in Japan
Populated coastal places in Japan